Guy William Rodgers (September 1, 1935 – February 19, 2001) was an American professional basketball player born in Philadelphia. He spent twelve years (1958–1970) in the NBA, and was one of the league's best playmakers in the early to mid-1960s.  Rodgers led the NBA in assists twice, and placed second six times. Rodgers was inducted into Naismith Memorial Basketball Hall of Fame in 2014.

Basketball career

Rodgers attended Northeast High School in Philadelphia, Pennsylvania, graduating in 1954. He played collegiately at Temple University from 1955–1958 for Hall of Fame Coach Harry Litwack.

Rodgers led Temple to a 74–16 record and third-place finishes in the 1956 NCAA basketball tournament, 1957 National Invitation Tournament and the 1958 NCAA basketball tournament. He became the school's leading career scorer with 1,767 points (19.6 points per game). Rodgers remains the third leading scorer in Temple history

The 1958 AP First Team All-American team consisted of four Naismith Basketball Hall of Fame inductees: Guy Rodgers Temple, Elgin Baylor Seattle, Wilt Chamberlain Kansas and Oscar Robertson Cincinnati. The other was Don Hennon Pittsburgh.

Rodgers was a territorial pick of the Philadelphia Warriors in the 1958 NBA draft.

Rodgers played alongside the great Wilt Chamberlain with the Warriors from 1959 through 1964. During Chamberlain's famous 100-point game, Rodgers had 20 assists.

In the 1962–63 season, Rodgers led the NBA in assists with 10.4 per game, playing in his first NBA All-Star game. On March 14, 1963, Rodgers tied Bob Cousy's record of 28 assists in a single game.

Rodgers excelled the following season as well, and was named to his second consecutive All-Star game alongside Chamberlain. The 1964 Warriors team was dominant in the regular season, and defeated the St. Louis Hawks to advance to the NBA Finals before losing the series to the Boston Celtics 4-1.

After averaging  18.6 points and 10.7 assists in 1965-1966 Rogers was traded on September 7, 1966, to the expansion Chicago Bulls for Jim King, Jeff Mullins and cash. Rodgers played the 1966–67 season in Chicago and was named an NBA All-Star for the fourth and final time in his career. That same season, Rodgers averaged 18.0 points and handed out a then-NBA record 908 assists (11.2), which is still the Chicago Bulls single-season record.

After four games in the 1967–68 season, Rodgers was traded to the Cincinnati Royals, joining Oscar Robertson in the backcourt. After the season in Cincinnati, Rodgers was selected by new Milwaukee Bucks in the expansion draft and joined the Bucks for his two final seasons, playing alongside rookie Kareem Abdul-Jabbar and helping the Bucks to their first playoff birth and first playoff series victory during the 1970 NBA playoffs. The following season, after Rodgers retired, the Bucks would acquire his former teammate Oscar Robertson, and win their first NBA Championship.

NBA career statistics

Regular season

Playoffs

Personal life
Rodgers died on February 19, 2001, at age 65 after a heart attack. He was survived by sons Tony and Mark, and daughter Nicole.

"Without question Guy Rodgers was the best passer I ever played with or against. Pete Maravich was close, but Guy was better. He made every play exciting", said basketball TV analyst Jon McGlocklin, who was a teammate of Rodgers in Milwaukee.

Honors

 Rodgers was a 2014 inductee to the Naismith Memorial Basketball Hall of Fame. During ceremonies on August 8, 2014. Earl Monroe served as Rodgers' presenter. His son Tony, accepted on behalf of the Rodgers family.
 Rodgers is one of four Temple retired jersey numbers. His #5 hangs in the Liacouras Center. Teammate Hal Lear (#6), Mark Macon (#12) and Bill Mlkvy (#20) are the others.
 Rogers was inducted into the Temple Athletic Hall of Fame in 1971.
 Rodgers was a charter member of the Philadelphia Big Five Hall of Fame in 1973.
 The Philadelphia Sports Hall of Fame inducted Rogers in 2005.

See also
List of National Basketball Association career assists leaders
List of National Basketball Association players with most assists in a game

References 

1935 births
2001 deaths
All-American college men's basketball players
American men's basketball players
Chicago Bulls players
Cincinnati Royals players
Milwaukee Bucks expansion draft picks
Milwaukee Bucks players
Naismith Memorial Basketball Hall of Fame inductees
National Basketball Association All-Stars
Philadelphia Warriors draft picks
Philadelphia Warriors players
Point guards
San Francisco Warriors players
Temple Owls men's basketball players
Basketball players from Philadelphia